Sergei Aleksandrovich Lebedkov (born 26 March 1981) is a Russian former professional football player.

Playing career
He made his debut in the Russian Premier League in 2000 for FC Spartak Moscow.

Honours
 Russian Premier League champion: 2000.
 Russian Cup finalist: 2005.

References

1981 births
Footballers from Tambov
Living people
Russian footballers
Russia under-21 international footballers
FC Spartak Tambov players
FC Spartak Moscow players
FC Elista players
FC Khimki players
FC Tom Tomsk players
FC Torpedo Moscow players
Russian Premier League players
FC Irtysh Omsk players
Association football midfielders
FC Neftekhimik Nizhnekamsk players
FC Spartak-2 Moscow players